Alfred Arthur Wheeler (26 August 1885 – 23 May 1929) was an Australian rules footballer who played for the Carlton Football Club in the Victorian Football League (VFL).

Notes

External links 
		
Alf Wheeler's profile at Blueseum

1885 births
Australian rules footballers from Victoria (Australia)
Carlton Football Club players
Australian military personnel of World War I
1929 deaths